This is a list of Brazilian films released in 2022.

Films

References

External links
 Brazilian films of 2022 at the Internet Movie Database

2022
Brazil